Center Township is a township in Clark County, Kansas, United States.  As of the 2000 census, its population was 1,097.

History
The Cimarron Redoubt, an Army fortification built in 1870, is located along Clark Creek (Redoubt Creek) south of its confluence with the Cimarron River, in southern Clark Township.

Geography
According to the USGS, it contains one cemetery, Saint Josephs and Highland.

The streams of Big Sandy Creek, Bullard Creek, Casino Creek, East Branch Bear Creek, Keiger Creek, Little Sandy Creek, Redhole Creek, Redoubt Creek, Spring Creek, Stink Creek and West Branch Bear Creek run through this township.

Transportation
Center Township contains one airport or landing strip, Harold Krier Field.

References

External links
 USGS Geographic Names Information System (GNIS)
 US-Counties.com
 City-Data.com

Townships in Clark County, Kansas
Townships in Kansas